Nanbao may refer to the following locations in China:

 Nangao, Lingao County (南宝镇), town in Hainan
 Nanbao, Luannan County (南堡镇), town in Hebei
 Nanbao Township (南堡乡), Handan County, Hebei
 Tangshan Nanbao Development Zone (唐山市南堡开发区), Hebei